Fajum  is a village in the administrative district of Gmina Brzeziny, within Kalisz County, Greater Poland Voivodeship, in west-central Poland. It is named after Faiyum in Egypt.

References

Fajum